Tauros is a transliteration of either  ('bull') or of Proto-Indo-European  ('wild bull', 'aurochs') and may refer to:
 Tauros Programme, an international effort to breed back domestic cattle to resemble the aurochs
 Tauros, a Pokémon species

See also 
 Tauris (disambiguation)
 Taurus (disambiguation)
 Centaur
 Minotaur
 Taro (river)
 Torus